Psychonotis caelius, the small green banded blue, is a species of butterfly of the family Lycaenidae. It is found in New Guinea and adjacent islands and along the eastern coast of Australia.

The wingspan is about 30 mm. Adult males are blue with a large white patch on the hindwings. Females are black with a large white patch on the wings.

The larvae feed on Alphitonia excelsa and Alphitonia petriei. It lives on the underside of a leaf of the host plant. They are pale green and hairy. Pupation takes place in a cream coloured pupa with brown markings, which is attached to the underside of a leaf.

Subspecies
P. c. caelius (Aru, Australia)
P. c. hanno (Grose-Smith, 1894) (New Britain)
P. c. korion (H. H. Druce and Bethune-Baker, 1893) (Kai Islands)
P. c. manusi (Rothschild, 1915) (Admiralty Islands)
P. c. mayae (D'Abrera, 1971) (Louisiades)
P. c. plateni (Grose-Smith and Kirby, [1896]) (Waigeu)
P. c. plotinus (Grose-Smith and Kirby, [1896]) (Papua New Guinea)

References

Butterflies described in 1860
Polyommatini
Butterflies of Oceania
Taxa named by Baron Cajetan von Felder
Taxa named by Rudolf Felder